The International Traditional and Heroic Contest is an international competition of Iranian traditional and heroic sports. Despite being Iranian sports, these sports have worldwide enthusiasts and athletes.

In the 2008 edition of the competition held in Kish Island in the Persian Gulf, Iran 17 national teams participated: 
 Azerbaijan
 Belarus
 Canada
 England
 Germany
 India
 Indonesia
 Iran
 Iraq
 Nepal
 Nigeria
 Sri Lanka
 South Korea
 Tajikistan
 Uganda
 Ukraine
 United States

The second international contest was held in February 2008 in Kish Island with the participation of 21 teams from 17 countries. The final standing were:

 1st Place : Iran
 2nd Place : Tajikistan
 3rd Place : Iraq
 4th Place : Nepal
 5th Place : Sri Lanka
 6th Place : South Korea

International sports competitions hosted by Iran
Sport in Iran
Multi-sport events in Iran
2008 in Iranian sport